Major-general Friedrich Otto Gebhard von Kielmansegg (17 December 176818 July 1851) was a German soldier and officer in the service of the Kingdom of Hanover who fought during the Waterloo Campaign.

Life

Friedrich von Kielmansegg was the son of Ratzeburg chemist Friedrich von Kielmansegg (1728-1800). His brother  was a senior officer in the military, while his younger brother  became Minister of War.

Kielmannsegg joined the military service of the Electorate of Brunswick-Lüneburg. The 1803 Convention of Artlenburg ended his military career and at first he withdrew to the family estate in Holstein. In the German Campaign of 1813 he was a colonel of collective defence at his personal expense (36,000 old taler). The same year he established his corps of jägers the Korps der Kielmannseggeschen Jäger. The corps was disbanded in 1814. Kielmannsegg was promoted to major general in 1815 and the same year led the Hanoverian Brigade at the battles of Quatre Bras and Waterloo. In 1816 he joined the new army of the Kingdom of Hanover and remained on active duty until 1832, becoming a lieutenant-general. He joined the Hannover Freemasons in 1839.

He died on 18 July 1851 in Hanover at the age of 82.

Awards 
He received the following orders and decorations:

References

Bibliography
 C. v. Düring: Geschichte des Kielmannseggeschen Jäger-Corps. Hannover 1863 
       
 Klaus Mlynek: Kielmannsegg, Friedrich Otto Gebhard Graf von. In Hannoversches Biographisches Lexikon. Schlüter, Hanover 2002, S. 198 

1768 births
1851 deaths
German commanders of the Napoleonic Wars
Knights Grand Cross of the Order of the Sword
Grand Crosses of the Order of the Dannebrog
Recipients of the Order of St. Anna, 2nd class
Recipients of the Order of St. Vladimir, 4th class